Manasquan may refer to:

Manasquan, New Jersey, a borough in Monmouth County, New Jersey, United States
Manasquan River, a waterway in central New Jersey draining to the Atlantic Ocean
Manasquan Reservoir
Manasquan (NJT station)
Manasquan Public Schools
Manasquan High School
Manasquan Inlet
USS Manasquan (AG-36)
Manasquan Friends Meetinghouse and Burying Ground